Alison Margaret Arngrim (born January 18, 1962) is an American actress and author. Beginning her television career at the age of twelve, Arngrim is a Young Artist Award–Former Child Star "Lifetime Achievement" Award honoree, best known for her portrayal of Nellie Oleson on the NBC television series Little House on the Prairie from 1974 to 1982.

Early life
Arngrim's father, Thor Arngrim, was a Canadian-born Hollywood manager. Her mother, Norma MacMillan of Vancouver, British Columbia, was an actress who provided the voices for characters as Casper on Casper the Friendly Ghost, as Gumby on Gumby, as Davey on Davey and Goliath, and Sweet Polly Purebred on Underdog, as well as other animated children's programs.

Her brother Stefan (b. 1955) was also a child actor, perhaps best known for his role as Barry Lockridge on the Irwin Allen science fiction television series, Land of the Giants. Arngrim has claimed that her brother sexually molested her from age six until nine, when he was aged from 13 to 16 years old.  Arngrim has claimed that her brother has admitted to the abuse but isn't particularly apologetic for his behavior. She also claims that she no longer has any kind of relationship with her brother which she feels has bettered her life.

Acting career
After beginning a career as a child model and actress in television commercials, Arngrim rose to fame as a child star in 1974, portraying the role of Nellie Oleson on the NBC television series Little House on the Prairie. She originally auditioned for the role of Laura Ingalls and, later, Mary Ingalls, but was instead cast in the role of antagonist Nellie Oleson. Arngrim would play the role of Nellie for seven seasons and her portrayal became a cultural reference and camp archetype for the spoiled "bad girl" throughout the 1970s.

Years later, in one of her stand-up routines, Arngrim described playing Nellie on Little House on The Prairie as "like having PMS for seven years." In 2002, she was honored by the Young Artist Foundation with its Former Child Star "Lifetime Achievement" Award for her work as a child actress on Little House. At the 2006 TV Land Awards, Arngrim tied with Danielle Spencer ('Dee' on What's Happening!!) as the "Character Most in Need of a Time-out" for her role as Nellie.

In addition to her role on Little House, Arngrim also recorded the comedy record album, Heeere's Amy, in which she portrayed first daughter Amy Carter. Her mother, who voiced the Kennedy children on the comedy albums of Vaughn Meader, also guest starred on the album. After leaving Little House, Arngrim appeared in guest-starring roles on such television series as The Love Boat and Fantasy Island. She was also a frequent panelist on the short-lived NBC game show Match Game-Hollywood Squares Hour.

Starting in 2006, she developed a successful career on stage in France, with her friend, author/director/comedian Patrick Loubatière. In 2017 in Pinehurst, North Carolina she appeared as Emily Brent in Judson Theatre Company's production of Agatha Christie's And Then There Were None.

Philanthropy
In addition to performing, Arngrim also devotes her time to charitable organizations. One of her inspirations for her charity work is the memory of her friend and fellow actor Steve Tracy, who played the role of Nellie Oleson's husband, Percival Dalton, on Little House on the Prairie. Tracy died from complications of AIDS in 1986,  after which Arngrim set her sights on becoming an activist for AIDS awareness including the organization ACT UP and working at AIDS hotline. She also focuses on other issues, such as child abuse, speaking frequently for and lobbying with the group PROTECT. In 2004, Arngrim revealed on Larry King Live that she herself was an incest survivor.

Author
In 2010, Arngrim authored an autobiography titled Confessions of a Prairie Bitch: How I Survived Nellie Oleson and Learned to Love Being Hated. In the book she, for the first time, publicly identified her then-teenaged brother as her childhood abuser, though the book is mostly light-hearted and received critical praise for her ability to mix humor and personal tragedy. She wrote and performed a stage version, which premiered at Club Fez in New York. She later performed this one-person show at Parliament House, a gay resort in Orlando, Florida.

Filmography

Awards

Wins
 2002 – Young Artist Award: Former Child Star Lifetime Achievement Award for (Little House on the Prairie)
 2006 – TV Land Award: for "Character Most Desperately in Need of a Timeout" (Little House on the Prairie)

Nominations
 1981 – Young Artist Award: for Best Young Comedienne (Little House on the Prairie)
 2008 – TV Land Award: for "Siblings That Make You Grateful for Your Own Crazy Family" (Little House on the Prairie)

References

Other sources

Further reading
 Dye, David. Child and Youth Actors: Filmography of Their Entire Careers, 1914-1985. Jefferson, NC: McFarland & Co., 1988, p. 7.

External links
 
 
 
 
 

1962 births
Living people
American autobiographers
American television actresses
American child actresses
HIV/AIDS activists
Actresses from New York (state)
American people of Canadian descent
Women autobiographers
21st-century American women